"Try to Remember" is a song about nostalgia from the musical comedy play The Fantasticks (1960). It is the first song performed in the show, encouraging the audience to imagine what the sparse set suggests. The words were written by the American lyricist Tom Jones while Harvey Schmidt composed the music.

Popular charts and early recordings

"Try to Remember" was sung by Jerry Orbach for the original off-Broadway production of The Fantasticks.

"Try to Remember" scored the Billboard Hot 100 popular music chart three times during 1965, with versions by Ed Ames, Roger Williams and Barry McGuire.

The song was the first Australian success for the trio New World. Their version peaked at no. 11 during late 1968.

In 1975, Gladys Knight & the Pips had an international success with their version of "Try to Remember", combining it into a medley with a cover version of Barbra Streisand's "The Way We Were". It scored no. 11 on the US Hot 100 chart, and no. 4 in the UK (their biggest success there). For Knight's version, she recited some of the lyrics from "Try To Remember" in spoken-word fashion before beginning to sing "The Way We Were".

Notable appearances in media and culture
 Jonathon Morris performed the song for the 1995 movie version of The Fantasticks.
 Hope Davis, as Maria Stark, performs part of this song during Tony Stark's hologram presentation in the early scenes of Captain America: Civil War.
 Sandy Duncan performed the song with The Muppets on The Muppet Show, Episode 114, since Sandy Duncan was the guest star of the episode.

References

Songs about nostalgia
1960 songs
Songs with music by Harvey Schmidt
Ed Ames songs
Gladys Knight & the Pips songs
Songs from musicals